B-17: Fortress in the Sky is a 2007 combat flight simulator video game for the Nintendo DS developed by American studio Skyworks Technologies Inc. It takes place during World War II in the air war over Germany and the occupied territories in the autumn of 1944.

Basic details
The game has separate missions, with each having two parts. The first part is usually fighting off attacks from other aircraft with machine guns that are placed in different locations on the plane, and the second part is bombing the required targets.

Reception

The game received "unfavorable" reviews according to the review aggregation website Metacritic.

References

External links

2007 video games
Combat flight simulators
Nintendo DS games
Nintendo DS-only games
Destination Software games
Video games developed in the United States